The National Institute of Hygiene and Epidemiology (NIHE) is located in Hanoi, Vietnam.

History
In 2012, the NIHE provided the H5N1 bird flu virus to researchers who transformed it and used the product to infect ferrets.

On 22 March 2017, the Japan International Cooperation Agency signed an agreement with the government of Vietnam so that the Japanese could transfer BSL3 technology to, among others, the NIHE.

References

Medical research institutes in Vietnam
Avian influenza
Biosafety level 3 laboratories
Year of establishment missing
Governmental office in Hanoi